Arakkonam is a Lok Sabha (Parliament of India) constituency in Tamil Nadu. Its Tamil Nadu Parliamentary Constituency number is 7 of 39.

Assembly segments

Arakkonam Lok Sabha constituency is composed of the following assembly segments:

Before 2009:

1.Pallipattu

2.Arakkonam (SC)

3.Solingar

4.Ranipettai

5.arcaud

6.Seyyaru

Members of the Parliament

 *as Tiruthani seat

Election results

General Election 2019

General Election 2014

General Election 2009

General Election 2004

 
 

Note: The incumbent party Dravida Munnetra Kazhagam did not contest this seat in 2004. Instead it was contested by its United Progressive Alliance (UPA) coalition partner Pattali Makkal Katchi (PMK), who won the seat. Thus, the UPA held the seat. PMK had not contested this seat in the previous 1999 elections.

See also
 Arakkonam
 List of Constituencies of the Lok Sabha

References

 Election Commission of India: https://web.archive.org/web/20081218010942/http://www.eci.gov.in/StatisticalReports/ElectionStatistics.asp

External links
 Arakkonam lok sabha  constituency election 2019 date and schedule

Lok Sabha constituencies in Tamil Nadu
Vellore district